Rob Gray may refer to:
Rob Gray (GMC operator)  (Big Mickey Gray)
Rob Gray (art director) (1962–2016), American art director and production designer
Rob Gray (basketball) (born 1994), American basketball player
Rob Gray (discus thrower) (born 1956), Canadian Olympic discus thrower

See also
Robert Gray (disambiguation)